Alison Mary Hore-Ruthven, Lady Barran (1902–1974) was one of the Ruthven Twins, or Ralli Twins, a pair of Bright Young Things scandalizing society for their antics.

Biography
Alison Mary Hore-Ruthven was born in 1902, the daughter of Walter Hore-Ruthven, 10th Lord Ruthven of Freeland and  Mary Ruthven, Lady Ruthven of Freeland.

As a young woman, Alison and her sister Margaret Leslie Hore-Ruthven, nicknamed "Peggy", were among the founders of the unofficial society of the Bright Young People and were dubbed by newspapers the "Ralli Twins" and by society as "A&P". They used to dress-alike and were basically identical. They were used to scandalize society, like when, at the coming-of-age party for Loel Guinness, went with very short, close-fitting silver dresses.

Both sisters modelled for a dress-making establishment. They were among the firsts in society to wear the low-heeled slippers making them fashionable. Under the name of Ralli Twins, they had a career dancing on stage, but family pressure had them renounce to this venture.

According to Cecil Beaton, in his The Book of Beauty: "The Ruthven Twins are the most striking pair, always identically dressed; even to the brass necklace, they are indistinguishable from one another. Richly carved with large full mouths, high cheek bones, and knobbly noses, they are as decorative as a pair of Assyrian rams. They are Byzantine goddess, dressed like fairies in a circus design by Picasso, with their dark locks tied with little tinsel bows, their spangled ballet-skirts, and low-heeled shoes."

In 1928 Alison Mary Hore-Ruthven married Commander Sir John Leighton Barran, 3rd Baronet.

References

1902 births
1974 deaths
British identical twins
English twins
Wives of baronets
English socialites
Daughters of barons